William Edward Clancy (April 12, 1879 – February 10, 1948) was a first baseman in Major League Baseball. He played for the Pittsburgh Pirates in 1905. Though he played only one season in the Majors, he spent 11 seasons in the minors, including four with Rochester, and also managed in the minors. He was buried in Oneida County, northern NY, not far from where he was born in Oswego County, NY.

References

External links

1879 births
1948 deaths
Major League Baseball first basemen
Pittsburgh Pirates players
Baseball players from New York (state)
Minor league baseball managers
Worcester Hustlers players
Montreal Royals players
Worcester Riddlers players
Oakland Oaks (baseball) players
Rochester Bronchos players
Buffalo Bisons (minor league) players
Baltimore Orioles (IL) players
Fort Wayne Brakies players
Fort Wayne Railroaders players